Santa Albertina is a municipality in the state of São Paulo in Brazil. The population is 6,022 (2020 est.) in an area of 272 km². The elevation is 420 m. It is situated on the border with the state of Minas Gerais, on the left bank of the Rio Grande.

Neighbouring  Municipalities

 Urânia
 Paranapuã
 Mesópolis
 Aspásia
 Santa Rita d'Oeste
 Carneirinho (Minas Gerais)

Distances
 Brasília (Capital City Of Brazil) : 754 km
 São Paulo (Capital City Of The State Of São Paulo) : 621 km
 São José do Rio Preto : 179 km 
 Araçatuba : 150 km
 Jales : 32 km

References

Municipalities in São Paulo (state)